Brick Up the Mersey Tunnels is a play about the story of the Kingsway Three, a fictitious terrorist organisation, and their plans to brick up the Tunnels which join Liverpool to the Wirral. It was written by Nicky Allt and Dave Kirby and performed at the Royal Court Theatre, Liverpool from 3 to 26 August 2006.

Cast
 Dennis Twacky - Roy Brandon
 Ann Twacky - Eithne Browne
 Nick Walton - Carl Chase
 Maggie - Suzanne Collins
 Gerard Gardener - David Edge
 Elliott Neston - Adam Keast
 Dickie Lewis/Dee Estuary - Andrew Schofield
 Miss Liz Card -  Francis Tucker

Production team
 Director - Bob Eaton
 Production Manager - Jasper Gilbert
 Set Design - Billy Meall
 Lighting designer - Rob Beamer
 Sound Design - Charlie Brown
 Musical Director - Howard Gray
 Producer - Kevin Fearon
 Technical Manager - Dave Hughes
 Lighting Operator - Andrew Patterson
 Sound Operator - Colyn D Lewin
 DSM - Nicola Donithorn
 ASM - Lee Anne Bannerman
 Stage Crew & Flys - Mark Goodall
 Stage Crew - Ben Cowper
 Costume Supervisor - Marie Jones

Re-Run
Brick Up The Mersey Tunnels returned to the Royal Court from Friday 13 July 2007 until Saturday 25 August 2007. All of the cast and much of the crew were the same as the first run.

The show returned for a third time at the Royal Court from 14 March to 12 April 2008, with  the same cast.
A new Brick up show "The Wrath of Anne Twacky was performed at The Royal Court in 2018 with virtually the same cast. It is the follow up to the original.

References

External links
 Royal Court Liverpool homepage 
 Review on ICLiverpool
 Review on BBC
 The Stage Review 2007
 Brick Up The Mersey Tunnels Website

Culture in Liverpool
British plays
2006 plays
Plays set in Liverpool